Heike Schwarm (born 17 October 1967) is a German gymnast. She competed in six events at the 1984 Summer Olympics.

References

External links
 

1967 births
Living people
German female artistic gymnasts
Olympic gymnasts of West Germany
Gymnasts at the 1984 Summer Olympics
People from Birkenfeld (district)
Sportspeople from Rhineland-Palatinate